We're All Doomed is an album by Boston crust punk band Toxic Narcotic. It was released in 2002 by Go-Kart Records. Lyrically, the album deals with politic and environmental issues. The songs on this album, like most Crust Punk, are short and only a small number are over 3 minutes long.

Track list
We're All Doomed   
Whatever It Takes    
I'm So Thirsty  
Asshole     
Ruined    
We're Not Happy 'Til You're Not Happy  
At War With Nature   
Pave the Planet    
Bullshit Conditions    
You Were Warned   
Talk Is Poison Idea    
Shut the Fuck Up    
5 Billion People Must Die

References

2002 albums
Toxic Narcotic albums
Go-Kart Records albums